Kim Clijsters and Rennae Stubbs were the defending champions but were eliminated in the round robin competition when they withdrew from their third match.

Cara Black and Martina Navratilova won the title, defeating Marion Bartoli and Daniela Hantuchová in the final, 6–0, 3–6, [10–8].

Draw

Final

Group A

Group B

References
Ladies' Invitation Doubles

Ladies' Invitation Doubles